Igreja do Convento Santo António da Lourinhã is a church in Portugal. It is classified as a National Monument.

Churches in Lisbon District
National monuments in Lisbon District
Franciscan churches in Portugal